Yumilicious is a self-serve, frozen yogurt franchise known for unique sweet and tart frozen yogurts. There are currently 15 locations in the United States of which 13 locations are in Texas and two located in South Carolina.

Background 
The first Yumilicious yogurt lounge opened in the Cityplace neighborhood of Uptown Dallas, Texas, on 14 October 2008. Originally known as Yogilicious, the company was concerned that the name "sounded too much like the names of other frozen yogurt stores", and changed the name to Yumilicious in 2009.

Yumilicious launched a mobile customer loyalty program with the mobile consumer engagement platform, Mocapay, on 10 May 2012.

See also
 List of frozen yogurt companies
 List of frozen dessert brands

References

Brand name frozen desserts
Fast-food chains of the United States
Ice cream parlors in the United States
Frozen yogurt businesses
2008 establishments in Texas
Restaurants established in 2008
Companies based in Dallas